

Codes

References

H